The 39th World Artistic Gymnastics Championships were held in Aarhus, Denmark, from October 13 to October 21, 2006.

The International Gymnastics Federation, which celebrated its 125th anniversary in 2006, introduced a new Code of Points at the World Championships, removing the "perfect 10" in favor of an open-ended code with separate scores for the difficulty and execution of a routine.

Vanessa Ferrari won the first female gold medal for Italy in the individual all-around.

Results

Men

Qualification

Team Final

All-around

Floor Exercise

Pommel Horse

Rings

Vault

Parallel Bars

Horizontal Bar

Women

Qualification

Team Final

All-around

Vault

Uneven Bars

Balance Beam

Floor Exercise

Medal count

Overall

Men

Women

References
 FIG official site

External links
 Official website of the championships

 
Artistic Gymnastics Championships
World Artistic Gymnastics Championships
Gymnastics
Gymnastics